The Sella is a river located in northwest Spain.  It flows through the region of Asturias from the Picos de Europa to the Bay of Biscay of the Atlantic Ocean at Ribadesella.

It hosts an annual canoe competition called the International Descent of the Sella River on the first Saturday in August.

See also 
 List of rivers of Spain

Rivers of Asturias
Rivers of Spain